Lianjiang (postal: Limkong) is a county-level city in the municipal region of Zhanjiang, Guangdong. The city has an area of 2,543 square kilometers, and had a population of about 1,680,000 as of 2010.

Geography 
Lianjiang lies in the north of the Leizhou Peninsula and faces Beibu Gulf to the southwest. The city is bordered to the east by Maoming; to the south by Wuchuan, Potou District, and Suixi County, all in Zhanjiang; to the west by Anpugang Harbour (part of the Gulf of Tonkin) and Beihai, in Guangxi Province; and to the north by Yulin. Lianjiang lies 48 kilometers north of Zhanjiang's city center.

Climate

Administrative divisions
The city is divided into 3 subdistricts and 18 towns.

Subdistricts 

Towns 

Education
By the end of 2009 there are 577 schools, colleges and universities in Lianjiang with 312,000 students.

The Guangdong Institute of Arts and Sciences is located in the city.

Transportation
The Litang–Zhanjiang railway and the Shenzhen–Zhanjiang high-speed railway both run through Lianjiang.

National Highway 207 and National Highway 325 both run through Lianjiang, as well as a number of provincial highways.

References

External links

  Lianjiang Government Online

County-level cities in Guangdong
Zhanjiang